Napal Licin, sometimes written as Napal Litjin from the Dutch East Indies era, is a location in south Sumatra that was visited by European explorers at the end of the 19th century. A cave in the area, Napal Licin Cave, features stalactites and stalagmites and is a tourist attraction that can be reached by boat up the Rawas River, a tributary of the Musi River.

Henry Ogg Forbes reached Napal Licin during his expedition to central Sumatra. He described it as a picturesque village at the base of a perpendicular limestone peak, Karang-nata (Karang Nato). He climbed it, describing the caves with stalactites and thousands of bats he encountered, as well as ferns, orchids, and a species of Boea. He also found a species of nutmeg with fruit "as large as the largest orange". He also found ants "milking" a Hemipteron which produced droplets for them.

Gallery

See also
Theloderma licin, a species of frog
Musi Rawas
Kerinci Seblat National Park

References

History of Sumatra